The Amiidae are a family of basal ray-finned fishes. The bowfin and the eyespot bowfin (Amia ocellicauda) are the only two species to survive today, although additional species in all four subfamilies of Amiidae are known from Jurassic, Cretaceous, and Eocene fossils.

Bowfins are now found throughout eastern North America, typically in slow-moving backwaters, canals, and ox-bow lakes.  When the oxygen level is low (as often happens in still waters), the bowfin can rise to the surface and gulp air into its swim bladder, which is lined with blood vessels and can serve as a primitive lung.

Amiidae is a monophyletic group that has numerous synapomorphic characters. Amiidae were widespread and particularly rich in species during the Eocene era. During this era, they appeared to be confined almost exclusively to fresh water.

Taxonomy
The family is divided into four subfamilies, with 11 genera described:
Amiidae
Subfamily Amiinae
Genus Amia
Genus †Cyclurus
Genus †Pseudoamiatus
Subfamily †Amiopsinae
Genus †Amiopsis
Subfamily †Solnhofenamiinae
Genus †Solnhofenamia
Subfamily †Vidalamiinae
Genus †Calamopleurus
Genus †Maliamia
Genus †Melvius
Genus †Pachyamia
Genus †Vidalamia
Subfamily incertae sedis
Genus †Nipponamia
Genus †Hispanamia

References

External links 

Amiiformes
Extant Jurassic first appearances
Taxa named by Charles Lucien Bonaparte
Ray-finned fish families